The 1967 Baylor Bears football team represented Baylor University in the Southwest Conference (SWC) during the 1967 NCAA University Division football season. In their ninth season under head coach John Bridgers, the Bears compiled a 1–8–1 record (0–6–1 against conference opponents), finished in last place in the conference, and were outscored by opponents by a combined total of 199 to 101. They played their home games at Baylor Stadium in Waco, Texas.

The team's statistical leaders included Alvin Flynn with 924 passing yards, Charles Wilson with 553 rushing yards, and George Cheshire with 475 receiving yards and 24 points scored. Greg Pipes and Randy Behringer were the team captains.

Schedule

References

Baylor
Baylor Bears football seasons
Baylor Bears football